Gili Mossinson (born 29 September 1978 in Tel Aviv, Israel) is an Israeli basketball player who played for several teams in the Israeli Basketball League including Hapoel Tel Aviv, Maccabi Rishon Letzion and Hapoel Galil Elyon. He came out as bisexual in 2016. 

Mossinson played for both Israel U18 (1996) and Israel U21 (1998), and played a single game in Israel's national basketball team, against Denmark.  

His father, Yigal Mossinson, was an author and playwright and laureate of the Prime Minister’s Prize for Authors.

References

1978 births
Living people
Israeli men's basketball players
Jewish men's basketball players
Israeli Jews
Israeli Basketball Premier League players
Ironi Ramat Gan players
Ironi Ramat HaSharon basketball players
Hapoel Galil Elyon players
Power forwards (basketball)
Maccabi Rishon LeZion basketball players
Israeli LGBT sportspeople
Israeli bisexual people
Bisexual sportspeople
Bisexual Jews
LGBT basketball players
Big Brother (franchise) contestants
Sportspeople from Tel Aviv